The Seventh Mother of all Battles Championship, commonly referred to as the 1997 Iraqi Elite Cup, was the seventh occurrence of the Iraqi Elite Cup, organised by the Iraq Football Association. The top eight teams of the 1996–97 Iraqi Premier League competed in the tournament. In the final, held at Al-Shaab Stadium, Al-Najaf defeated Al-Shorta 4–0.

Group stage

Group 1

Group 2

Semifinals

Third place match

Final

References

External links
 Iraqi Football Website

Football competitions in Iraq
1997–98 in Iraqi football